Fraxinus pallisiae is a species of flowering plant belonging to the family Oleaceae.

Its native range is Southeastern Europe to Moldova, Caucasus.

References

pallisiae